Fort Mitchell Depot is a historic railway depot located at Fort Mitchell, Lunenburg County, Virginia. It is a one-story, four-bay, rectangular frame vernacular building that is approximately 20 feet wide and 48 feet long.  It consists of two sections: the rear, freight portion of the depot, built about 1860, of heavy timber, mortise and tenon construction and clad with board and batten siding; and the front passenger portion of the depot built about 1884. The passenger portion consists of two segregated waiting rooms separated by a vertical, beaded board wall.  It ceased use as a passenger station in 1956.

It was listed on the National Register of Historic Places in 2009.

References

Railway stations on the National Register of Historic Places in Virginia
Railway stations in the United States opened in 1860
Buildings and structures in Lunenburg County, Virginia
National Register of Historic Places in Lunenburg County, Virginia